James Trezvant (died September 2, 1841) was a U.S. Representative from Virginia. He was also a slave owner.

Biography
Born in Sussex County, Virginia, Trezvant studied law after college.  He was admitted to the bar and began practicing law in Jerusalem, Virginia, eventually rising to position of attorney general in the state. In 1820, Trezvant served as delegate to the State constitutional convention, and subsequently served in the State house of delegates.

He was elected to the Nineteenth and Twentieth Congresses and as a Jacksonian to the Twenty-first Congress (March 4, 1825 – March 3, 1831).  He served as chairman of the Committee on Military Pensions during the Twenty-first Congress.

Trezvant served in the Virginia Constitutional Convention of 1829-1830 from Southampton County in a district composed of Sussex, Surry, Isle of Wight, Prince George, and Greensville Counties. He served on the Committee of the Executive Department.

He was one of the judges in Southampton County in the trials of the people involved in the Nat Turner rebellion.
He died in Southampton County, Virginia on September 2, 1841.

Electoral history

1825; Trezvant was elected to the U.S. House of Representatives unopposed.
1827; Trezvant was re-elected unopposed.
1829; Trezvant was re-elected unopposed.

References

Bibliography

1841 deaths
Virginia Attorneys General
Virginia lawyers
Year of birth unknown
Jacksonian members of the United States House of Representatives from Virginia
19th-century American politicians
People from Sussex County, Virginia
American slave owners

People from Southampton County, Virginia